Ejectment is a common law term for civil action to recover the possession of or title to land.  It replaced the old real actions and the various possessory assizes (denoting county-based pleas to local sittings of the courts) where boundary disputes often featured.  Though still used in some places, the term is now obsolete in many common law jurisdictions, in which possession and title are sued by the actions of eviction (also called possession proceedings) and quiet title (or injunctive and/or declaratory relief), respectively.

Originally, successful ejectment meant recovery of possession of land, for example against a defaulting tenant or a trespasser, who did not have (or no longer had) any right to remain there.  It has continued to be used for this, though in some jurisdictions the terminology has changed.

Legal fiction 
Over time, actions of ejectment were applied to try land claims in place of older real actions such as the assize of novel disseisin. A practice developed of trying the title to ownership of land by means of a special ejectment chiefly for ensuring a low court and had the added advantage of some confidentiality among the landed gentry.

The claimant granted (or so professed) a lease to a friend which had passed to a fictitious person (such as John Doe), who became the nominal plaintiff: the real claimant (plaintiff) was thereby the "lessor of the plaintiff".  The action was vicarious.  The action was brought against the real defendant or, more usually, for semi-secrecy and to ensure the low court, against another fictitious person (e.g. William Styles), in many papers termed the "casual ejector", who both sides' papers would state evicted the first fictitious tenant(s) by virtue of an (equally fictitious) lease granted by the real defendant. The title of the action would then be "Doe dem. [name of real claimant] v. [Defendant] or [fictitious counter-tenant]".  E.g. Doe dem. John Hurrell Luscombe  Yates, Hawker, and Mudge (1822) 5 B. & Ald. 544 (England; 1822),

A letter was sent in the name of the casual ejector to the real defendant, inviting him to defend the case on behalf of his supposed tenant. The defendant's right to appear depended on the existence of the fictitious lease (an existence he would willingly assert or, failing to do, lose by default). This enabled the rights of the real parties to be litigated in a low court.

As explained by Maitland:

Such fictitious actions have been abolished in many jurisdictions as a result of the provision of alternative remedies.

See also 
 Estrepement
 Waste (law)

References

External links
Medieval Sourcebook: F. W. Maitland: The Forms of Action at Common Law, 1909 (at Fordham University)

Landlord–tenant law
Legal fictions
Legal history